British Rail Class D1/3 (formerly DY1) was a locomotive class commissioned by British Rail in England. It was a diesel powered locomotive in the pre-TOPS period built by Ruston & Hornsby at their Iron Works in Lincoln. In appearance, it was similar to British Rail Class 97/6, but with an 0-4-0 wheel arrangement.

D2958 was later sold for use at C.F. Booth Ltd., Rotherham.

Allocations

D2957 
Delivered as 11507, renumbered April 1958. Delivered to Immingham Shed in March 1956, moved to Stratford Shed in January 1957. It was then moved to Goole Shed in August 1966 but stored at Hull Dairycoates. It was withdrawn in March 1967 and moved to Slag Reduction, Ickles, Rotherham for scrap in June and was cut up by August.

D2958 
Delivered as 11508, renumbered March 1958. Delivered to Immingham Shed in May 1956, moved to Stratford Shed in December 1956. It was withdrawn in January 1968 when it was sold to C.F. Booth in Rotherham, moving there in May 1968. It continued in use at the companies South Yorkshire yard until 1981 when it was taken out of use; it was scrapped in October 1984.

See also
 List of British Rail classes

References

Sources

Further reading

D001.03
B locomotives
Railway locomotives introduced in 1956
Standard gauge locomotives of Great Britain
Scrapped locomotives
Ruston & Hornsby locomotives